Alavieska is a municipality of Finland. It is located in the province of Oulu and is part of the Northern Ostrobothnia region.

The municipality is unilingually Finnish. The word Ala means "lower", while the word Vieska is supposed to mean a "shallow ford".

The scythe theme of Alavieska's coat of arms refers to the extensive meadows in the municipality's territory. The coat of arms was designed by Kaj Kajander, and the Alavieska municipal council approved it at its meeting on September 20, 1960. The Ministry of the Interior approved the coat of arms for use on November 25 of the same year.

Geography
Neighbouring municipalities are Kalajoki, Merijärvi, Oulainen and Ylivieska.

Villages
In 1967, Alavieska had six legally recognized villages (henkikirjakylät):

 Alavieska
 Eteläranta
 Kähtävä
 Somero
 Taluskylä
 Käännänkylä

Demographics 
In 2020, 19.3% of the population of Alavieska was under the age of 15, 55.8% were aged 15 to 64, and 24.9% were over the age of 64. The average age was 43.8, above the national average of 43.4 and regional average of 40.8. Speakers of Finnish made up 99.0% of the population and speakers of Swedish made up 0.2%, while the share of speakers of foreign languages was 0.8%. Foreign nationals made up 0.6% of the total population. 

The chart below, describing the development of the total population of Alavieska from 1975-2020, encompasses the municipality's area as of 2021.

Urban areas 
In 2019, out of the total population of 2,519, 1,281 people lived in the sole urban area, the Alavieska parish village, while lived 1,220 in sparsely populated areas and the coordinates of 18 people were unknown. This made Alavieska's degree of urbanization 51.2%.

Economy 
In 2018, 23.1% of the workforce of Alavieska worked in primary production (agriculture, forestry and fishing), 22.4% in secondary production (e.g. manufacturing, construction and infrastructure), and 52.9% in services. In 2019, the unemployment rate was 8.8%, and the share of pensioners in the population was 29.5%.

Notable people
Pentti Kahma, discus thrower
Teemu Kattilakoski, skier
Rauli Pudas, pole vaulter

See also
 Ylivieska

References

External links
 
Municipality of Alavieska – Official website 

Municipalities of North Ostrobothnia
Populated places established in 1879